The 2014–15 Texas Tech Red Raiders basketball team represented Texas Tech University in the 2014–15 NCAA Division I men's basketball season. The team was led by head coach Tubby Smith, who brought in a whole new coaching staff with him last season. The Red Raiders played their home games at the United Supermarkets Arena in Lubbock, Texas and were members of the Big 12 Conference.

Recruits

Roster

Schedule

|-
!colspan=12 style="background:#CC0000; color:black;"| Exhibition

|-
!colspan=12 style="background:#CC0000; color:black;"| Non-conference regular season

|-
!colspan=12 style="background:#CC0000; color:black;"| Big 12 regular season

|-
!colspan=12 style="background:#CC0000; color:black;"| Big 12 tournament

External links
Official Texas Tech Red Raiders men's basketball page 

Texas Tech Red Raiders basketball seasons
Texas Tech
Texas Tech
Texas Tech